Yip Tin-shing (born 20 October 1965) is a Hong Kong screenwriter.

Career 
Yip is a long-time screenwriter for films directed by Johnnie To and/or Wai Ka-fai of Milkyway Image and frequently works alongside screenwriters Szeto Kam-yuen, Wai Ka-Fai, Yau Nai-hoi and Au Kin-yee.

Filmography

Writer
Bachelor Party (2012)
Turning Point 2 (2011)
Life Without Principle (2011)
72 Tenants of Prosperity (2010)
Turning Point (2009)
Newsmakers (2009)
Tactical Unit - The Code (2008) (TV movie)
Triangle (2007)
Exiled (2006)
Election 2 (a.k.a. Triad Election) (2006)
Election (2005)
Throw Down (2004)
Breaking News (2004)
Running on Karma (2003)
Turn Left, Turn Right (2003)
Love For All Seasons (2003)

Awards and nominations

External links
 

Hong Kong screenwriters
Living people
1965 births